Gerald Wilson Graham (born 31 January 1941) is an English former professional footballer who played in the Football League for Mansfield Town, Peterborough United and Workington.

References

1941 births
Living people
English footballers
Association football midfielders
English Football League players
Blackpool F.C. players
Peterborough United F.C. players
Cambridge United F.C. players
Mansfield Town F.C. players
Hereford United F.C. players
Cambridge City F.C. players
Worcester City F.C. players
Workington A.F.C. players
Nuneaton Borough F.C. players